Tevin Shaw (born 24 February 1997) is a Jamaican professional footballer who plays as a midfielder for USL League One club Greenville Triumph and the Jamaica national team.

Club career

Boys' Town
Shaw played youth football with National Premier League side Boys' Town, where he captained the club's youth sides from the U13 to U20 level. In 2014, he signed his first professional contract with the club. Shaw made four appearances for Boys' Town that season, and made another five the following year.

Tivoli Gardens
In summer 2016, Shaw signed with Tivoli Gardens. He made 31 league appearances that season, scoring one goal, and started both legs of Tivoli's playoff series against Portmore United. The following season, Shaw made another 27 league appearances, scoring two goals, and again started in both legs of Tivoli's playoff series, this time against Cavalier. In the 2018–19 season, he made 27 league appearances, scoring one goal.

Portmore United
In summer 2019, Shaw signed with defending champions Portmore United. That season he made 21 league appearances, scoring one goal, and played 90 minutes in the away leg of Portmore's CONCACAF Champions League series against Mexican giants Cruz Azul.

Atlético Ottawa
On 26 March 2020, Shaw signed for Canadian Premier League side Atlético Ottawa. However, due to the COVID-19 pandemic, he was unable to join the side for the 2020 season, meaning he spent the year without any competitive football. But despite this, he was re-signed by Ottawa in 2021.

FC Tucson
On 1 February 2022, FC Tucson announced the signing of Tevin Shaw.

Greenville Triumph SC
Following Tucson's voluntary self-relegation to USL League Two, Shaw signed with Greenville Triumph on 12 January 2023.

International career
Shaw received his first call-up to the Jamaica national team in May 2017 for a warm-up friendly against Peru ahead of the 2017 Caribbean Cup. He ultimately missed out on the Caribbean Cup due a quadricep injury. Shaw made his debut for Jamaica on 30 January 2018 in a friendly against South Korea.

Career statistics

Club

International

References

1997 births
Living people
Jamaican footballers
Association football midfielders
Jamaica international footballers
National Premier League players
Canadian Premier League players
Boys' Town F.C. players
Tivoli Gardens F.C. players
Portmore United F.C. players
Atlético Ottawa players
FC Tucson players
Greenville Triumph SC players
Jamaican expatriate footballers
Jamaican expatriate sportspeople in Canada
Expatriate soccer players in Canada
Jamaican expatriate sportspeople in the United States
Expatriate soccer players in the United States